Fork is an unincorporated community in Dillon County, South Carolina, United States. Fork has a post office with ZIP code 29543.

References

Unincorporated communities in Dillon County, South Carolina
Unincorporated communities in South Carolina